Orphan Star (1977) is a science fiction novel  by American writer Alan Dean Foster. The book is Foster's eighteenth published book, his fifth original novel, and is chronologically the third entry in the Pip and Flinx series.  Bloodhype (1973) was the second novel to include Pip and Flinx, but it is eleventh chronologically in the series and the two characters had a relatively small part in that novel's plot.

Plot summary

The novel takes place in 550 A.A. (After Amalgamation in Foster’s timeline, 2950 AD). Flinx, no longer a poor orphan, is chasing a merchant to Hivehom and Terra in search of information about his parentage.  Along the way Flinx is joined by Sylzenzuzex, a female Thranx member of the Commonwealth Church.  His chase leads him to Ulru-Ujurr, a planet under Edict from the United Church, ostensibly because it contains a highly intelligent telepathic race. It is on Ulru-Ujurr that he discovers the mystery of his parentage and begins the childlike Ulru-Ujurrians on their "Game of Civilization".

References

External links

Alan Dean Foster homepage

1977 American novels
Humanx Commonwealth
Novels by Alan Dean Foster
1977 science fiction novels
Sequel novels
American science fiction novels
Del Rey books